John Eldridge Haggart (April 19, 1846 – September 20, 1905) was an American politician who served as a member of the North Dakota Senate from North Dakota's admission in 1889 to his appointment as United States Marshal for the state in 1898.

References

1846 births
1905 deaths
20th-century American politicians
Republican Party North Dakota state senators